The 2018 FIFA World Cup qualification UEFA Group C was one of the nine UEFA groups for 2018 FIFA World Cup qualification. The group consisted of six teams: Germany, Czech Republic, Northern Ireland, Norway, Azerbaijan, and San Marino.

The draw was for the first round (group stage) which was not held as part of the 2018 FIFA World Cup Preliminary Draw on 25 July 2015, starting 18:00 MSK (UTC+3), at the Konstantinovsky Palace in Strelna, Saint Petersburg, Russia.

The group winners, Germany, who finished with a 100% record, qualified directly for the 2018 FIFA World Cup. The group runners-up, Northern Ireland, advanced to the play-offs as one of the best eight runners-up.

Standings

Matches
The fixture list was confirmed by UEFA on 26 July 2015, the day following the draw. Times are CET/CEST, as listed by UEFA (local times are in parentheses).

Goalscorers
There were 106 goals scored in 30 matches, for an average of  goals per match.

5 goals

 Thomas Müller
 Sandro Wagner
 Joshua King

4 goals

 Michal Krmenčík

3 goals

 Afran Ismayilov
 Antonín Barák
 Vladimír Darida
 Julian Draxler
 Serge Gnabry
 Leon Goretzka
 Timo Werner
 Kyle Lafferty
 Josh Magennis
 Mohamed Elyounoussi

2 goals

 Theodor Gebre Selassie
 Jan Kopic
 Mario Gómez
 Jonas Hector
 Sami Khedira
 Joshua Kimmich
 André Schürrle
 Chris Brunt
 Steven Davis
 Jamie Ward

1 goal

 Araz Abdullayev
 Maksim Medvedev
 Dimitrij Nazarov
 Ruslan Qurbanov
 Rashad Sadygov
 Ramil Sheydayev
 Václav Kadlec
 Filip Novák
 Jaromír Zmrhal
 Julian Brandt
 Emre Can
 Mats Hummels
 Toni Kroos
 Shkodran Mustafi
 Mesut Özil
 Antonio Rüdiger
 Sebastian Rudy
 Kevin Volland
 Amin Younes
 Stuart Dallas
 Jonny Evans
 Gareth McAuley
 Conor McLaughlin
 Conor Washington
 Adama Diomande
 Markus Henriksen
 Martin Linnes
 Martin Samuelsen
 Ole Selnæs
 Alexander Søderlund
 Mirko Palazzi
 Mattia Stefanelli

1 own goal

 Rashad Sadygov (against Norway)
 Chris Brunt (against Norway)
 Michele Cevoli (against Azerbaijan)
 Davide Simoncini (against Norway)
 Mattia Stefanelli (against Germany)

Discipline
A player was automatically suspended for the next match for the following offences:
 Receiving a red card (red card suspensions could be extended for serious offences)
 Receiving two yellow cards in two different matches (yellow card suspensions were carried forward to the play-offs, but not the finals or any other future international matches)

The following suspensions were served during the qualifying matches:

Notes

References

External links

Qualifiers – Europe: Round 1, FIFA.com
FIFA World Cup, UEFA.com
Standings – Qualifying round: Group C, UEFA.com

C
2016 in Norwegian football
2017 in Norwegian football
2016–17 in German football
Germany at the 2018 FIFA World Cup